Castanhal Esporte Clube, commonly referred to as Castanhal, is a Brazilian professional football club based in Castanhal, Pará founded on 7 September 1924. It competes in the Campeonato Paraense, the top flight of the Pará state football league.

History
Founded in 1924, Castanhal Esporte Clube came soon after the founding of the town of Castanhal. A group of local sportsmen gathered and formed the club. Among the founders, Jota Vicente, Orvácio Batista and Lauro Cardoso. The club was professionalized in 1975. It ended up moving away in 1978.. He returned to professionalism in 1998. He has the nickname of Japiim, a bird of yellow and black plumage, very common in the region. Today, Castanhal is a great frequenter of the elite phase of the Campeonato Paraense leading the midsize clubs that are still in contention. Representing the municipality that originated its name, the Castanhal counts on the strength of its great crowd to repeat feats of the past.

In 2003, the club won the Campeonato Paraense Second Division. In the main division of the championship, his best campaign was in the year 2000 when he lost to Paysandu.

In the national scenario, Castanhal participated twice in the Campeonato Brasileiro Série C. In 2000 he finished 27th out of 36 teams. Four years later he finished in the 33rd position of 60 participants in that edition. In the Copa do Brasil, the club participated only once. It was in 2003, when it was eliminated in the first phase by Ponte Preta.

Stadium
Castanhal play their home games at Estádio Maximino Porpino Filho. The stadium has a maximum capacity of 4,800 people.

Honours
 Campeonato Paraense Second Division
 Winners (1): 2003

References

External links
 Official site

Association football clubs established in 1924
Football clubs in Pará
1924 establishments in Brazil